Concrete Cowboys is a 1979 American Western television film starring Jerry Reed and Tom Selleck, directed by Burt Kennedy. It was broadcast on CBS on October 17, 1979.

The film is also known as Highway Action (in Finland), Nashville detective (in Italy) and Ramblin' Man, the latter under which it was released on video by a few companies, including Edde Entertainment.

Plot
Will Eubanks (Tom Selleck) and his rowdy gambling buddy J.D. Reed (Jerry Reed) are two good-time roustabouts. After being caught in a sting card game, the two men are forced to leave town in a hurry. Hopping on a freight train, they end up in Nashville and, mistaken for detectives, they are hired to locate a singer (Morgan Fairchild) who has mysteriously disappeared. By the time they realize this game is more than either one of them can handle, they are embroiled in an intricate blackmail scheme with deadly results.

Cast
Jerry Reed as J.D. Reed
Tom Selleck as Will Eubanks
Morgan Fairchild as Kate / Carla
Claude Akins as Woody Stone
Roy Acuff as Himself
Barbara Mandrell as Herself
Ray Stevens as Himself
Lucille Benson as Peg the Madam
Gene Evans as Lt. Blocker
 Randy Powell as Lonnie Grimes
Red West as Sheriff
Grace Zabriskie as Mrs. Barnaby
 Bob Hannah as Mr. Barnaby (Wax Museum)
Joseph Burke as Hatcheck, Casino owner
Seidina Reed as Singer on Cumberland Queen

Soundtrack
 Jerry Reed – "Breakin' Loose"

Television series

A 1981 TV series based on the film and sharing its title, with Reed reprising his role as J.D. Reed and Geoffrey Scott taking over Tom Selleck's role as Will Eubanks, was broadcast on CBS from February 7 to March 21, 1981 and cancelled after seven episodes.

Episode list

External links
 
 Concrete Cowboys on YouTube
 

1979 television films
1981 American television series debuts
1981 American television series endings
English-language television shows
Films directed by Burt Kennedy
Western (genre) television films
1970s English-language films